{{Album ratings
| rev1 = AllMusic
| rev1Score = <ref>{{cite web|url=https://www.allmusic.com/album/together-mw0000691369|title=Together|work=AllMusic|accessdate=2018-11-05}}</ref>
|rev2 = Christgau's Record Guide|rev2Score = C
}}Together is the tenth studio album by Anne Murray, released in November 1975. The album reached number 15 on the U.S. country album charts and #142 on the pop albums charts.  It was one of Murray's few albums during this time period that did not chart in Canada. Two singles were released from the album: "The Call" (also sometimes referred to as "Long Distance Call"), which reached #19 and #6 on the U.S. country and  A/C singles charts respectively, and "Sunday Sunrise", which reached #49 on the country singles charts, and  #13 on the A/C singles charts. "The Call" was a rerecording of a song, which Murray had originally included on her Honey, Wheat and Laughter'' album in 1970. This album also has the distinction of having the great Dusty Springfield doing backup vocals.

Track listing
 "If It's All Right With You" (Gene MacLellan)
 "Sunday Sunrise" (Mark James)
 "Out On The Road Again" (Steve Eaton)
 "Part-Time Love" (David Gates)
 "The Call" (Gene MacLellan)
 "Everything Old Is New Again" (Peter Allen, Carole Bayer Sager)
 "Lady Bug" (James Stein)
 "Player In The Band" (Brenda Russell, Brian Gordon Russell)
 "Blue Finger Lou" (Alan O'Day)
 "Together" (Buddy G. De Sylva, Lew Brown, Ray Henderson)

Production
Songs arranged and conducted by Michael Omartian, Lee Holdridge and Artie Butler.

References

1975 albums
Anne Murray albums
Capitol Records albums
EMI Records albums
Albums arranged by Lee Holdridge
Albums produced by Tom Catalano